is a Japanese mathematician working on algebraic analysis. He is a professor emeritus at RIMS. He was a student of Mikio Sato at the same time as Masaki Kashiwara with whom he later shared the Asahi Prize in 1987.

References

1945 births
Living people
People from Tsushima, Aichi
20th-century Japanese mathematicians
21st-century Japanese mathematicians
Algebraic geometers
Academic staff of Kyoto University